Gina Dowding (born 15 July 1962) is a British politician who served as a Member of the European Parliament (MEP) for North West England from 2019 to 2020, on behalf of the Green Party.  She was elected to the role in the 2019 European Parliament Election on 23 May of that year.

Before being elected as an MEP, Dowding was a Green Party councillor on Lancaster City Council from 1999 to 2007 and again in 2019, and a councillor on Lancashire County Council from 2013.

Dowding first joined the Green Party in 1986 at the age of 22, citing a voluntary work visit to Bangladesh as a turning point in her awareness of inequality.

Electoral performance

References

1962 births
Living people
MEPs for England 2019–2020
21st-century women MEPs for England
Green Party of England and Wales MEPs
Green Party of England and Wales councillors
Green Party of England and Wales parliamentary candidates
Members of Lancashire County Council
Women councillors in England